A B-stage is a small, secondary stage, featured at pop and rock concerts held in arenas and stadiums, and is usually located in the middle of the concert floor, connected to the main stage by a walkway.

Origins

Although its origins trace back further, the B-stage was popularized by U2 on their 1992–1993 Zoo TV Tour. It provided a more intimate setting for stripped-down, quieter versions of songs, that could be played in greater proximity to the audience.

Current examples
B-stages are still commonly used, having become a standard feature of large rock and pop concerts.

Britney Spears
Britney Spears used a B-stage on her 2001-02 Dream Within a Dream Tour. The B-Stage was connected to the main stage by a runaway, giving the stage the appearance of a giant key. Spears would also use a mini barge suspended in the air to get to the B-stage.

For 2009's The Circus Starring Britney Spears, the show included two small circular B-Stages connected to the main circular stage, giving the whole stage the appearance of a three ring circus.

Spears also used a B-Stage for the North American shows of 2011's Femme Fatale Tour. The B-Stage contains a large circular rotating platform that could lift up. The runaway connecting the B-Stage to the main stage had conveyor belts, allowing Spears and her dancers to perform on them and walk faster.

Madonna

Madonna has used a B-stage in five of her ten tours starting with The Girlie Show, Confessions Tour, Sticky & Sweet Tour, The MDNA Tour and Rebel Heart Tour connected by a catwalk. In The MDNA Tour, she has employed a "V" catwalk to connect the main stage with the B stage.

Aerosmith and Bon Jovi
Aerosmith has employed a B-stage on almost every tour since 2001 (sometimes connected by a catwalk). During their outdoor amphitheater performances from 2001 to 2003, Aerosmith would play three songs on this stage during the middle of the show, and in more recent years, the band members go back and forth between the main stage and the B-stage throughout their performances via a catwalk. Bon Jovi made use of such a stage during their 2008 Lost Highway Tour in which Jon Bon Jovi (and sometimes Richie Sambora) would sing ballads such as "Bed of Roses", "Always", or "Living in Sin" from a smaller stage closer to the crowd, while the rest of the band performed on the main stage.

Backstreet Boys
Backstreet Boys employed a B-stage on their Black & Blue Tour in 2001, playing several ballads from the small circular stage in the middle of the audience. The band appeared on the B-stage via a platform in the center that raised the band from beneath the stage after a blackout and segue video which concealed their travel to the B-stage. They returned to the main stage during the final B-stage song on a bridge over the audience that descended from the rafters, and was raised again after the song.

Coldplay
Coldplay have been using a B-Stage since their 2008/2009 Viva la Vida Tour. Coldplay make use of a B-stage and a C-Stage at different points in each show. The B-stage, located at the end of a catwalk, attached to the main stage, was used in the middle of the set to perform a remix of "God Put a Smile Upon Your Face" and "Talk", as well as a piano version of "The Hardest Part". The C-stage was used at the end of the main setlist to perform three songs acoustically, and was located at the back of venue, in the audience. On the following tours, the Mylo Xyloto Tour and the A Head Full of Dreams Tour, B and C-Stages remain in use, with the B-stage located at the end of the catwalk with a giant screen on the floor.

Beyoncé 
Beyoncé has used a B-Stage on every tour since her 2009 I Am... World Tour, in the middle of her show she appears from under the stage wrapped in a harness and taken up and over the audience where she performs "Baby Boy", she then runs through the audience back to the main stage performing "Say My Name". During The Mrs. Carter Show World Tour in 2013/2014 her "BeyStage" included two VIP pit sections with a catwalk in the middle. She also used a B-stage during her 2014 On the Run Tour with Jay-Z, and her Formation World Tour in 2016.

Kiss

Hard rock band Kiss is using a B-stage when they perform songs like "I Was Made for Lovin' You" or "Love Gun", songs which lead vocals are done by Paul Stanley. Stanley is "flying" to a B-stage located in the middle of the crowd.

After having performed his "blood spitting" show, Gene Simmons flies to another B-stage located above the stage before performing one of his "theme songs" like "God of Thunder", "Unholy" “War Machine” or "I Love It Loud".

Examples of this can be seen on the Rock the Nation DVD.

Taylor Swift
Taylor Swift has used B-stage on every tour since her debut Fearless Tour, where it was positioned on the far end of the arena; this configuration was also used for her subsequent Speak Now World Tour and The Red Tour. For The 1989 World Tour, the B-stage was connected to the main stage through a large catwalk, which would run through the entire floor (for the arena shows) or until the middle of the floor (for the stadium shows). On her Reputation Stadium Tour, two B-stages were positioned at the left and right far end of the stadiums, and she would use a flying basket to get to one of the B-stages, running through the crowd to go the another one. She uses B-stages to perform stripped-down versions of her songs, as well as covers and surprise songs.

Lady Gaga
Lady Gaga frequently uses B-stages on her tours, incorporating them in the Monster Ball Tour where it was located just a few metres away from the main stage, the artRAVE Ball Tour in which 2 separate B-stages and 3 smaller satellite stages were incorporated into the arena layout for performances of "Gypsy", "Born This Way", "Dope", "You and I" and "Do What U Want", connected by transparent catwalks flanked with LED lighting on either side, and the Joanne World Tour, where a B-stage was located at the end of the arena and was used for performances of "Come To Mama", "The Edge of Glory" and "Born This Way".

Girls Aloud
Girls Aloud have used B-Stages on three of their concert tours. On 2008's Tangled Up Tour, a movable catwalk connecting the main stage and B-stage would be lowered and suspended above the crowd during the middle of the show. The group would perform a ballad while walking the catwalk out to the B-Stage. After performing another song on the B-Stage they would sing another song while walking back to the main stage.

On their 2009 Out of Control Tour, the B-Stage was once again located in the middle of the arena. The group would perform on a moving platform that flew over the crowd. After performing three songs on the B-Stage, the group would once again get back on the moving platform and sing another song while traveling back to the main stage.

For 2013's Ten: The Hits Tour, the B-Stage was again in the center of the arena. The group would perform a song while flying out to the B-stage on a giant sign reading the band's name. Once at the B-stage they would perform three songs before returning to the main stage.

Other examples
Mariah Carey also used a B-Stage in her The Adventures of Mimi Tour.

Powderfinger used a B-stage on their 2010 Sunsets Farewell Tour, located at the back of the venue. Midway through the show, the band would leave the main stage and make their way to the B-stage while historical video footage played out on the main video screen. The clip ended with a boxer "punching" the camera, alluding to the video of the song "Like a Dog", which they would then perform on the B-stage. The band would perform another song, then return to the main stage.

German Neue Deutsche Härte Band Rammstein used a B-stage during their 2011-2013 Made In Germany tour which was connected to main stage by a lowerable bridge connected to the venue ceilings.

References

External links

 For examples of different types of portable and modular stages that are used as B-stages

Concerts